A polo handicap is a system created by Henry Lloyd Herbert, the first president of the United States Polo Association, at the founding of the USPA in 1890 so teams could be more evenly matched when using players with varying abilities.

The players are rated on a scale from minus-2 to 10. Minus-2 indicates a novice player, while a player rated at 10 goals has the highest handicap possible. It is so difficult to attain a 10-goal handicap that there are fewer than two dozen in the world, and about two-thirds of all players handicapped are rated at two goals or less. Currently, most living ten-goal players are Argentine, with few exceptions.

Handicaps of five goals and above generally belong to professional players. It is not (nor has it ever been) an estimate of the number of goals a player might score in a game, but rather of the player's worth to their team. It is the overall rating of a player's horsemanship, team play, knowledge of the game, strategy, and horses. At one time, polo was the only sport in the world that considered sportsmanship when rating a player.

In matches played by "handicapped" players (as opposed to open competition, where handicaps are not considered), the handicaps of all four players are totaled. If the total handicap of a team is more than that of the team against which they are playing, the difference is added to the scoreboard. For example, if the Mounties polo team has a total handicap of six goals and the Tayto team has a handicap of four goals, Tayto would begin the match with a two-goal advantage.

A player's handicap is usually assessed by a committee at the authorizing club of his country. A professional player may be assigned an equivalent rating in countries where he competes.
Though standards are similar, the ratings may be expressed differently. e.g.:

Argentina: 0 to 10

USA: C (-2), B (-1), B+ (-0.5), A (0), A+ (0.5), 1.0, 1.5, 2 to 10

England: -2 to 10.

Ten-goal players, highest handicap achieved in outdoor polo

 Rodolphe Louis Agassiz (1871–1933) – USA
 Mariano Aguerre (born 1969) – Argentina / USA 
 Gary Brown - Aruba
 Alejandro Diaz Alberdi - Argentina
 Enrique Alberdi - Argentina
 Juan ALberdi - Argentina
 Mike Azzaro – USA
 Ulysses Hu - China
 Miguel (Miki) Novillo Astrada – Argentina
 Gerald Barnard Balding Sr. (1903–1957) - England's last 10 goal player.
 Adolfo Cambiaso (born 1975) – Argentina
 Guillermo (Sapo) Caset - Argentina
Bartolomé Castagnola (born 1970) – Argentina 
 Carlos Gracida (1960–2014) – Mexico
 Guillermo Gracida Jr. (1956) - Mexico
 Alfredo Harriott – Argentina (born 1945)
 Juan C. Harriott Jr. (born 1936) - Argentina 
 Alberto Pedro Heguy – Argentina (born 1941)
 Bautista Heguy – Argentina / England
 Gonzalo Heguy - Argentina
 Horacio Heguy - Argentina
 Ignacio Heguy – Argentina
 Marcos Heguy – Argentina
Tommy Hitchcock, Jr. (1900 –1944) – USA
 Foxhall Keene (1867–1941) - USA 
 Lewis Lacey (1887–1966) – Argentina.
 Juan Martin Nero - Argentina.
 Pablo Mac Donough (born 1982) – Argentina / Spain / USA
 Agustin Merlos – Argentina / Spain / USA
 Sebastian Merlos – Argentina
 Lucas Monteverde (born 1976) – Argentina
 Juan Martin Nero – Argentina / Spain
 Alfonso Pieres - Argentina
 Nicolas (Nico) Pieres - Argentina
 Facundo (Facu) Pieres (born 1986) – Argentina / USA
 Gonzalo Pieres Jr. (born 1982) – Argentina / France
 Gonzalo Pieres Sr. - Argentina
 Pablo (Polito) Pieres (born 1987) – Argentina 
 Aidan Roark (1905–1984) – Ireland 
 John Sinclair-Hill (born 1934) - Australia
 Bob Skene (1914–1997) - Australia 
 David Stirling (born 1981) – Uruguay 
 Louis Ezekiel Stoddard (1881–1951) – USA 
 John Arthur Edward Traill (1882–1958) – Argentina / Ireland 
 Ernesto Trotz - Argentina
 Hilario Ulloa (born 1985) – Argentina
 Tommy Wayman (born 1946) – USA

Nine-goal players, with a maximum 9-goal handicap achieved in outdoor polo
 Rodrigo De Andrade - Brazil
 Eduardo Novillo Astrada – Argentina
 Ignacio Novillo Astrada – Argentina
 Javier Novillo Astrada – Argentina 
 Joginder Singh Baidwan (1904–1940) - India
 Francisco Bensadon - Argentina
 Juan Britos - Argentina
 Alfredo Capella Barabucci - Argentina
 Bartolome (Barto) Castagnola - Argentina
 Camilo (Jeta) Castagnola - Argentina
 Diego Cavanagh - Argentina
 Santiago Chavanne – Argentina
 Lucas Criado – Argentina
 Francisco DeNarvaez – Argentina
 Alejandro Diaz-Alberdi (born 1963) – Argentina
 Gabriel Donoso (1960–2006) – Chile
 Ignatius (Nachi) Du Plessis - South Africa
 Francisco Elizalde - Argentina
 Elbridge T. Gerry Sr. (1908-1999) - United States
 Alberto Heguy – Argentina
 Eduardo Heguy – Argentina
 Howard Hipwood - England
 Julian Hipwood - England
 Matias MacDonough – Argentina
 Juan Alberto Merlos (1945) – Argentina
 Juan I. Merlos – Argentina
 Man Singh II (1912-1970) – India
 Facundo Sola - Argentina
 Guillermo Terrera - Argentina
 Santiago (Santi) Toccalino - Argentina
 Eric Leader Pedley (1896-1986) - United States

References

External links
 General Explanation of Handicaps 
 Handicaps in the USA, See handicap Section

Polo